Capranica may refer to:
House of Capranica, a noble Roman family; to this are related:
Teatro Capranica, a theatre in Rome originally built in 1679
Almo Collegio Capranica, a pontifical seminary in Rome for the training of priests
Capranica Prenestina, a comune in the Metropolitan City of Rome, Italy
Capranica, Lazio, a comune in the Province of Viterbo, Italy
Caprarica di Lecce, town and comune in the Italian province of Lecce